Rote Zora may refer to:

 Die rote Zora und ihre Bande, translated as The Outsiders of Uskoken Castle, a 1941 children's novel by Kurt Kläber
 Die rote Zora und ihre Bande (TV series), 1979 television series based on the novel
 Die Rote Zora, 2008 film based on the novel
 Rote Zora (group), a West German far-left feminist organization active 1974–1995